Tierney Sutton (born June 28, 1963) is an American jazz singer.

Career
Sutton was born in Omaha, Nebraska, but grew up in Milwaukee, Wisconsin. She received a bachelor's degree from Wesleyan University in Middletown, Connecticut, and attended the Berklee College of Music in Boston.

For over 20 years, Sutton has led the Tierney Sutton Band with pianist Christian Jacob, bassists Trey Henry and Kevin Axt, and drummer Ray Brinker. The band is an incorporated unit and makes all musical and business decisions together. They tour throughout the world and have headlined at Carnegie Hall, The Hollywood Bowl, and Jazz at Lincoln Center.

Sutton has been a Bahaʼi since 1981 and explains her band's arranging style as "based on the principle of consultation – the band is very much run on Baha'i principles. There is very much a sense that what we do is essentially a spiritual thing and everyone's voice needs to be heard."

Paris Sessions (Varèse Sarabande, 2014), featuring guitarist Serge Merlaud and bassist Kevin Axt, received a Grammy Award nomination for Best Jazz Vocal Album in 2014, while The Sting Variations was nominated in the same category in 2016. Pianist Christian Jacob composed and arranged soundtrack music for the Clint Eastwood production Sully which was performed by Sutton and the band.

Discography 
 Introducing Tierney Sutton (A Records, 1997)
 Unsung Heroes (Telarc, 2000)
 Blue in Green (Telarc, 2001)
 Something Cool (Telarc, 2002)
 Dancing in the Dark (Telarc, 2004)
 I'm with the Band (Telarc, 2005)
 On the Other Side (Telarc, 2007)
 Desire (Telarc, 2009)
 American Road (BFM Jazz, 2011)
 After Blue (BFM Jazz, 2013)
 Paris Sessions (BFM Jazz, 2014)
 The Sting Variations (BFM Jazz, 2016)
 Sully movie soundtrack, with Clint Eastwood (Varese Sarabande, 2016)
 Screen Play (BFM Jazz, 2019)
 The Paris Sessions 2 (BFM Jazz, May 6, 2022)

Grammy nominations

References

External links
 Official site

1963 births
Living people
Wesleyan University alumni
University of Southern California faculty
American jazz singers
American women jazz singers
American Bahá'ís
Converts to the Bahá'í Faith
20th-century Bahá'ís
American women academics
21st-century American women